Todor Trayanov (born 30 May 1995) is a Bulgarian footballer currently playing as a midfielder for Septemvri Simitli.

Career
Trayanov began his career at Pirin Blagoevgrad. In January 2015, he joined Septemvri Simitli on loan until the end of the 2014–15 season.

In June 2015, Trayanov returned to Pirin. He made his first competitive appearance for the club in a 0–0 away league draw against Levski Sofia on 30 August.

In June 2018, Trayanov signed with Botev Vratsa. After a loan spell at KKS Kalisz, he left Botev Vratsa. He then signed for Polish club KKS Kalisz on 8 January 2019.

References

External links
 

1995 births
Living people
People from Blagoevgrad Province
Bulgarian footballers
Bulgaria under-21 international footballers
First Professional Football League (Bulgaria) players
Second Professional Football League (Bulgaria) players
Association football midfielders
OFC Pirin Blagoevgrad players
FC Septemvri Simitli players
FC Botev Vratsa players
FC Lokomotiv 1929 Sofia players
Expatriate footballers in Poland
Sportspeople from Blagoevgrad Province